Real Recognize Real is the sixth studio album by American rapper Project Pat. It was released in February 2009 via Hypnotize Minds/Asylum Records.

Track listing

Chart history

References

2009 albums
Project Pat albums
Asylum Records albums
Albums produced by DJ Paul
Albums produced by Juicy J